The following is a list of Houston Cougars men's basketball head coaches. There have been nine head coaches of the Cougars in their 77-season history.

Houston's current head coach is Kelvin Sampson. He was hired as the Cougars' head coach in April 2014, replacing James Dickey, who resigned after the 2013–14 season.

References

Houston

Houston Cougars basketball, men's, coaches